Malcolm Roach (born June 9, 1998) is an American football defensive tackle for the New Orleans Saints of the National Football League (NFL). He played college football at Texas.

Early life
Malcolm Roach was born  to Nancy and Mike Roach in Baton Rouge, Louisiana. He was coached by his father at Madison Prep, where he was four-time all-state selection.

College career
Roach was a member of the Texas Longhorns for four seasons. He finished his collegiate career with 134 tackles, 22.5 tackles for loss, and 8.0 sacks.

Professional career

Roach was signed by the New Orleans Saints as an undrafted free agent on April 27, 2020. He made the team out of training camp. Roach made his NFL debut on September 13, 2020 in the season opener against the Tampa Bay Buccaneers.

On November 20, 2021, Roach was placed on injured reserve. He was released on December 7 and re-signed to the practice squad. He signed a reserve/future contract with the Saints on January 12, 2022.

On September 1, 2022, Roach was placed on injured reserve. He was activated on October 8.

References

External links
Texas Longhorns bio
New Orleans Saints bio

1998 births
American football defensive tackles
Living people
New Orleans Saints players
Texas Longhorns football players
Players of American football from Baton Rouge, Louisiana
African-American players of American football
21st-century African-American sportspeople